Afternoons in Utopia is the second album by German synth-pop band Alphaville, released in 1986 via Warner Music. The album was recorded between September 1985 and May 1986.

A remastered and re-released version of the album, on both CD and vinyl, was released on 7 May 2021.

Background
Afternoons in Utopia is the follow-up to Alphaville's successful first album, Forever Young. Singer/songwriter Marian Gold said of these albums, "our first album emerged from the smut of the Here and Now and our second led back to our roots in Sugar Candy Mountain", and the band employed no less than 27 guest musicians and singers to record the songs. Alphaville released five singles from the album: "Dance with Me", "Universal Daddy", "Jerusalem", "Sensations" and "Red Rose", with all but "Sensations" charting internationally.

The album was remastered and re-released in May 2021 and includes the original album, plus "14 remastered B-sides, 12-inch and seven-inch remixes, demos and a rare live version of the single 'Dance With Me'. The release was overseen by original band members Gold and Bernhard Lloyd, and was remastered by Lloyd and Stefan Betke.

Reviews 

Reviews for this album were again generally positive, with one reviewer saying "at points things are just bad yup-funk for wine bars, but a couple of misfires aside, Afternoons in Utopia holds up well" and "in retrospect it's actually a successful endeavour, perfectly evocative of a mainstream style."
The album finished in the Top 20 in five European countries and at #174 the US. Another reviewer points out that "by the time of this album's 1986 release, synth-pop was no longer a chart concern."

Album notes 
The album's lyrics make several references to cosmic entities ("sci-fi" as one reviewer called it), including comets, the planet Mars and its landscape, and a starship. When the word "smile" is used in the songs "Afternoons in Utopia," "Lassie Come Home," and "Red Rose," it's printed in the liner notes as the acronym S.M.I².L.E., a reference to Timothy Leary, which stands for "Space Migration, Increased Intelligence, [and] Life Extension."

Marian Gold, singer and songwriter for the band, acknowledged that the message of their music was different from their previous album with this comment which accompanied the song "Sensations" in the liner notes for the 1992 release First Harvest 1984-92: "Sometimes people used to say, 'Have they gone crazy now? Talking with dolphins and all that!!' But I think that once we've learned the language of the dolphins - this mutual approach - that could be the moment of significant change in our messed up civilization.

Track listing

2021 Remaster
The first disc of the 2021 remaster is the same as the original 1986 release.

The first song on the album, "IAO" ("International Aquarian Opera"), begins with the word "night" and fades into the short IAO chorus, which itself is a lyric from the song "Afternoons in Utopia". The album ends with the song "Lady Bright", a limerick about relativity, wherein the Lady Bright leaves one day and returns "the previous ...[night]", with the word "night" omitted, thus the album loops back to its beginning.

The song "Afternoons in Utopia" is dedicated "For Inka" in the liner notes for the album.

Chart positions

Album credits
Afternoons in Utopia was composed by Marian Gold, Bernhard Lloyd, and Ricky Echolette. All songs produced by Peter Walsh except where noted.

 "IAO"
 Children's Choir - Stephanie Cooling, Peter Docherty, Louise McKenna, Jenny Troy, David Walround
 "Fantastic Dream" (produced by Steve Thompson and Michael Barbiero)
 Alan Childs - Drums
 David Lebold - Keyboards
 Jimmy Maelen - Percussion
 Jimmy Ripp - Guitars
 Carmine Rojas - Bass guitar
 "Jerusalem" (produced by Wolfgang Loos)
 Denice Brooks - Backing vocals
 Turhan Geza - Percussion
 Roger Linn - Drums
 Wolfgang Loos - Keyboards
 Gustl Luetjens - Guitars
 William "Kooley" Scott - Backing vocals
 Jocelyn B. Smith - Backing vocals
 "Dance with Me" (produced by Steve Thompson and Michael Barbiero)
 Michael Barbiero - Backing vocals
 Dave Lebold - Keyboards
 Roger Linn - Drums
 Jimmy Maelen - Percussion
 Jimmy Ripp - Guitars
 "Afternoons in Utopia" (produced by Wolfgang Loos and Peter Walsh)
 Children's Choir - Stephanie Cooling, Peter Docherty, Louise McKenna, Jenny Troy, David Walround
 Wolfgang Loos - Keyboards
 "Sensations"
 Guy Barker - Trumpets
 Stuart Brooks - Trumpets
 Andy Brown - Bass guitar
 Judy Cheeks - Backing vocals
 Roger Linn - Drums
 Victoria Miles - Backing vocals
 Phil Palmer - Guitars
 Frank Ricotti - Percussion
 Neil Sidwell - Trombone
 Robin Smith -   Brass arrangements
 Phil Todd - Saxophones
 "20th Century"
 Roger Linn - Drums
 Robin Smith - Keyboards
 "The Voyager"
 Guy Barker - Trumpets
 Stuart Brooks - Trumpets
 Andy Brown - Bass guitar
 Judy Cheeks - Backing vocals
 Bob Jenkins - Additional drums
 Roger Linn - Drums
 Robin Smith - Keyboards and Brass arrangements
 Phil Todd - Saxophones
 Peter Walsh - Keyboards
 "Carol Masters"
 Andy Brown - Bass guitar
 Bob Jenkins - Additional drums
 Roger Linn - Drums
 Phil Palmer - Guitars
 Frank Ricotti - Percussion
 Peter Walsh - Keyboards
 "Universal Daddy"
 Guy Barker - Trumpets
 Stuart Brooks - Trumpets
 Andy Brown - Bass guitar
 Judy Cheeks - Backing vocals
 Bob Jenkins - Additional drums
 Roger Linn - Drums
 Victoria Miles - Background vocals
 Phil Palmer - Guitars
 Frank Ricotti - Percussions
 Neil Sidwell - Trombone
 Robin Smith - Keyboards and Brass arrangements
 Phil Todd - Saxophones
 "Lassie Come Home"
 Andy Brown - Bass guitar
 Bob Jenkins - Additional drums
 Janey Klimek - Guest vocal performance
 Roger Linn - Drums
 Phil Palmer - Guitars
 Frank Ricotti - Percussion
 Robin Smith - Keyboards and Brass arrangements
 Phil Todd - Saxophones
 "Red Rose"
 Guy Barker - Trumpets
 Stuart Brooks - Trumpets
 Andy Brown - Bass guitar
 Judy Cheeks - Backing vocals
 Roger Linn - Drums
 Victoria Miles - Backing vocals
 Phil Palmer - Guitars
 Frank Ricotti - Percussion
 Neil Sidwell - Trombone
 Robin Smith - Keyboards and Brass arrangements
 Phil Todd - Saxophones

References 

1986 albums
Alphaville (band) albums
Albums produced by Peter Walsh